The Kotelawala cabinet was the central government of Ceylon led by Prime Minister John Kotelawala between 1953 and 1956. It was formed in October 1953 after the resignation of Kotelawala's predecessor Dudley Senanayake and it ended in April 1956 after the opposition's victory in the parliamentary election.

Cabinet members

Parliamentary secretaries

Notes

References

Cabinet of Sri Lanka
Ministries of Elizabeth II
1953 establishments in Ceylon
1956 disestablishments in Ceylon
Cabinets established in 1953
Cabinets disestablished in 1956